The 2013 NRL Under-20s season (commercial known as the 2013 Holden Cup due to sponsorship from Holden) was the sixth season of the National Rugby League's Under-20s competition. It was formerly called the Toyota Cup until 2013 when Holden bought the sponsorship. The draw and structure of the competition mirrored that of the NRL's 2013 Telstra Premiership.

Season summary

Ladder

Stats

Leading try scorers

Leading point scorers

Leading goal scorers

Leading field goal scorers

References

External links
Official website
Statistics & Match Reports